João Soares Almeida Filho (born 15 February 1954) is a former Brazilian footballer. He had the same given name with his father, thus had a suffix Filho (means son) in his name.

References
https://web.archive.org/web/20090504021711/http://futpedia.globo.com/jogadores/joaozinho3

Brazilian footballers
Brazilian football managers
Brazil international footballers
1975 Copa América players
Association football forwards
Footballers from Belo Horizonte
1954 births
Living people
Campeonato Brasileiro Série A players
Campeonato Brasileiro Série A managers
Cruzeiro Esporte Clube players
Sport Club Internacional players
Club Athletico Paranaense players
Coritiba Foot Ball Club players
Santos FC managers